This is a list of members of the Victorian Legislative Assembly, from the elections of 14 February; 3, 16 March 1871 to the elections of 25 March; 9, 22 April 1874. Victoria was a British self-governing colony in Australia at the time.

Note the "Term in Office" refers to that members term(s) in the Assembly, not necessarily for that electorate.

 Champ resigned in May 1873, replaced by George Higinbotham in a by-election the same month.
 Fellows left Parliament December 1872, replaced by Robert Murray Smith in an 1873 by-election.
 McCulloch resigned around March 1872, replaced by James Purves in a March 1872 by-election.
 Russell resigned in January 1873 replaced by John Montgomery in a February by-election.
 Spensley left Parliament around May 1873, replaced by Thomas Must in a May 1873 by-election.
 Witt resigned July 1872, replaced by John Orr in a by-election the same month

Charles MacMahon was Speaker, Benjamin Davies was Chairman of Committees.

References

Members of the Parliament of Victoria by term
19th-century Australian politicians